Kaipokok Bay is a bay in Labrador, Canada. The geographic feature extends for 75 km inland from the northern Atlantic Ocean. The bay is sparsely populated, with Postville being the only permanent settlement on the bay. Several trading posts existed along the bay until the 1950s.

References

See also
 List of communities in Newfoundland and Labrador
 Geology of Newfoundland and Labrador

Hudson's Bay Company trading posts
Populated places in Labrador